Ealing was a parliamentary constituency centred on the Ealing district of west London.  It returned one Member of Parliament (MP) to the House of Commons of the UK Parliament, 1885–1945.  In common with metropolitan areas the seat saw major population increase.  Until 1918 it included Chiswick, Acton within the County of London, and part of Hanwell in the rump of dwindling Middlesex.

Boundaries
1885–1918: The civil parishes of Ealing, Acton, Greenford, Chiswick and Perivale and part of that of Hanwell.
1918–1945: The Municipal Borough of Ealing (as it stood in 1918, being Ealing, ignoring 1926 succession to the former urban districts of Greenford (including the parishes of Perivale and West Twyford) and Hanwell).

History
The constituency was created by the Redistribution of Seats Act 1885 for the 1885 general election, and abolished for the 1945 general election. It was then replaced by the new Ealing East and Ealing West constituencies.

Members of Parliament

Elections

Elections in the 1880s 

Hamilton was appointed First Lord of the Admiralty, causing a by-election.

Elections in the 1890s 

Hamilton is appointed Secretary of State for India, requiring a by-election.

Elections in the 1900s

Elections in the 1910s 

General election 1914–15:

Another general election was required to take place before the end of 1915. The political parties had been making preparations for an election to take place and by the July 1914, the following candidates had been selected; 
Unionist: Herbert Nield
Liberal:

Elections in the 1920s

Elections in the 1930s 

General election 1939–40

Another general election was required to take place before the end of 1940. The political parties had been making preparations for an election to take place and by the Autumn of 1939, the following candidates had been selected; 
Conservative: Frank Sanderson
Labour: D. J. Johnston

References

Parliamentary constituencies in London (historic)
Constituencies of the Parliament of the United Kingdom established in 1885
Constituencies of the Parliament of the United Kingdom disestablished in 1945
Politics of the London Borough of Ealing